Fish Haven, originally named Rush Creek, is an unincorporated community along the shores of Bear Lake in Bear Lake County, Idaho, United States. It is 4 km (2.5 miles) north of the Utah border.

History
The first settlement at Fish Haven was made in 1864. A post office called Fish Haven was established in 1867, and remained in operation until 1962.  The community was so named because nearby Bear Lake is a favorite fishing spot.

Fish Haven's population was estimated at 100 in 1909, and was 130 in 1960.

References

Unincorporated communities in Bear Lake County, Idaho
Unincorporated communities in Idaho
Populated places established in 1864